Blech may refer to:

People
 Benjamin Blech, American orthodox rabbi
 David Blech, American businessman
 Gustavus M. Blech, American physician
 Hans Christian Blech, German actor 
 Jörg Blech, German journalist and author
 Leo Blech, German opera composer and conductor

Other
 Blech, a metal sheet used by Jews to cover stovetop burners
 Brass instruments (Blech in German)
Blech, a synchronous programming language